Marcelo Leonardo Ojeda (born 8 December 1968, in Avellaneda) is a former Argentine football goalkeeper. He played in Argentina and Spain.

Ojeda started his playing career in 1987 in the Argentine 2nd division with Defensa y Justicia. In 1990, he joined Club Atlético Lanús of the Argentine Primera where he played until 1994.

In 1994 Ojeda joined CD Tenerife where he would spend most of the rest of his career. In 1997, he played 1 game for the Argentina national team and was a squad member for the 1997 Copa América.

In 2000, he returned to Argentina where he played 3 games for Estudiantes de La Plata before going back to Tenerife later that year. In 2001, he joined Argentinos Juniors but retired from football before ever playing for the club

External links

 Tenerife profile
 Argentine Primera statistics

1968 births
Living people
Sportspeople from Avellaneda
Argentine footballers
Argentina international footballers
Argentine expatriate footballers
1997 Copa América players
Association football goalkeepers
Argentine Primera División players
Defensa y Justicia footballers
Club Atlético Lanús footballers
CD Tenerife players
La Liga players
Estudiantes de La Plata footballers
Expatriate footballers in Spain
Argentine expatriate sportspeople in Spain